Andrei Vladimirovich Meshcheryakov (born 8 February 1984) is a former Russian professional football player.

Club career
He played in the Russian Football National League for FC Fakel Voronezh in 2005.

External links
 

1984 births
People from Krasnosulinsky District
Living people
Russian footballers
Association football forwards
FC Zenit-2 Saint Petersburg players
FC Fakel Voronezh players
FC Lukhovitsy players
Sportspeople from Rostov Oblast